Hanover was a Regierungsbezirk of the German state of Lower Saxony from 1946 until 2004. It was located in the centre and the south of the state, centered on the Lower Saxon capital of Hanover.

History
There was a similar, equally named administrative unit within the then Prussian Province of Hanover from 1885 until the end of World War II; and before that, a 1823 established Landdrostei within the Kingdom of Hanover.

Kreise (districts) from 2001 to 2004
 Diepholz
 Hamelin-Pyrmont (Hameln-Pyrmont)
 Hanover (Hannover)
 Hildesheim
 Holzminden
 Nienburg
 Schaumburg

External links
 History of Hanover 
 Situation of private households 
 Situation in the middle ages 

 
Geography of Lower Saxony
Former states and territories of Lower Saxony
States and territories established in 1885
States and territories disestablished in 2004
Government regions of Prussia
1885 establishments in Germany
2004 disestablishments in Germany
Former government regions of Germany